Etiwan Park is a public park on Daniel Island in Charleston, South Carolina. The city spent $100,000 on the first phase of the park's development starting in late 1995. Work continued, and the city spent $325,000 in the fall of 1998.

Notes

Parks in Charleston, South Carolina